Carlo Ponte (born 3 May 1890, date of death unknown) was an Italian wrestler. He competed in the Greco-Roman bantamweight at the 1924 Summer Olympics.

References

External links
 

1890 births
Year of death missing
Olympic wrestlers of Italy
Wrestlers at the 1924 Summer Olympics
Italian male sport wrestlers
Sportspeople from Genoa
20th-century Italian people